Orders to Kill is a 1958 British wartime drama film. It starred Paul Massie, Eddie Albert and Irene Worth and was directed by Anthony Asquith. The film is based on a story by Donald Chase Downes, a former American intelligence operative who also acted as technical adviser to the film. Downes's story was screenwritten by George St. George and Paul Dehn.

Plot
Gene Summers, a young American bombardier, is selected by Major Kimball to go on a mission to Nazi-occupied Paris and kill a man believed to be a double agent working in the French Resistance. Summers is picked because of his military experience and fluency in French. He receives rigorous training by his handler Major MacMahon and a British naval commander. Summers is enthusiastic, and remembers all of the information he needs by setting it to melodies of childhood songs. MacMahon, however, has misgivings about Summers' boyish enthusiasm, and fears that his youth and inexperience might jeopardise the mission.

Arriving in France, Summers meets his Resistance contact, Léonie, a dressmaker whose clients include the girlfriend of a high-ranking German officer. Léonie gives Summers more information about the man he is to assassinate, Marcel Lafitte. However, after observing and then unexpectedly meeting Lafitte at a café, Summers begins to have second thoughts about his mission. Lafitte seems to be gentle, polite, friendly and intelligent, has a wife and daughter whom he obviously loves, and also dotes on his cat Mimieux, carefully protecting her from harm at a time when cats are being killed and eaten due to food shortages.

At a subsequent meeting, with curfew drawing near, Lafitte apparently saves Summers from being detained by German troops (who are hunting a Resistance assassin) by allowing Summers to take shelter in Lafitte's office. Summers' misgivings deepen and he begins to doubt whether Lafitte is really guilty.

Summers runs back to Léonie and reveals his doubts about Lafitte. She rebukes him sharply for his folly and reminds him that he would not have been given his orders without reason, and then furiously upbraids him after he reacts to her tirade by inadvertently revealing details of his war service. Léonie points out to Summers that he dropped hundreds of bombs on people while he was a pilot. Summers protests that there is a difference between killing a lot of people at a distance and one person up close. "When I dropped bombs I wasn't there at the other end." Léonie then apologises for her curt behaviour and explains to him that her son was killed in the war, and she counters his doubts about Lafitte's supposed innocence by questioning how Lafitte could have known in advance about the German manhunt that Lafitte had helped Summers to evade.

His confidence regained, Summers prepares to kill Lafitte. Returning to Lafitte's office, he first cracks a blunt object over the man's head, but the blow merely stuns him. The stricken Lafitte turns over to look directly up into the eyes of the young man, and utters a single word: "Why?" In a panic, Summers stabs Lafitte with a pair of scissors, killing him. He steals money from Lafitte's table and tries to make the scene look like a robbery.

Narrowly escaping the Gestapo, the distraught Summers hides the money in a cemetery. He tries to contact Léonie, but it is too late: the Nazis have captured her. Racked with guilt, Summers goes off into the night.

Several months later, after Paris has been liberated, MacMahon is giving the newly promoted Colonel Kimball a tour of the now liberated Paris and informs Colonel Kimball that Summers is in a military hospital. After the assassination, Summers became a drunkard, using the money he stole from Lafitte to pay for the liquor. Summers finds out that Léonie was killed by the Nazis after her capture. At first, the major and the colonel try to convince him that Lafitte was guilty and that many lives were saved by killing him. However, Summers is not convinced and, after Kimball departs, insists that MacMahon tell him the truth. MacMahon confirms that Lafitte was in fact innocent.

Summers leaves the hospital and visits Lafitte's wife and daughter, who are now impoverished. Unable to tell them the truth, Summers tells them that Lafitte was one of their best agents in the Resistance and offers them the small compensation of his own back pay.

Production details 
The film was based on an original story by Donald Downes. Downes was an important OSS officer involved in numerous operations during the war. He became a writer after the war.  The novel Orders to Kill by Downes was published after the film was shot.

The film won three BAFTA film awards, including best actress for Irene Worth as Léonie and best newcomer to Paul Massie for his performance in the lead role of Summers. The film was entered into the 1958 Cannes Film Festival.

The famous silent movie actress Lilian Gish has a cameo as the pilot's mother.

Cast
Eddie Albert as Major MacMahon
Paul Massie as Gene Summers
Lillian Gish as Mrs. Summers
James Robertson Justice as Naval Commander
Leslie French as Marcel Lafitte
Irene Worth as Léonie
John Crawford as Maj. Kimball
Lionel Jeffries as Interrogator
Nicholas Phipps as Lecturer Lieutenant
Sandra Dorne as Blonde with German officer
Jacques B. Brunius as Cmndt. Morand (as Jacques Brunius)
Robert Henderson as Col. Snyder
Miki Iveria as Louise
Lillie Bea Gifford as Mauricette (as Lillabea Gifford)
Anne Blake as Mme. Lafitte
Sam Kydd as Flight Sergeant Flint
Ann Walford as F.A.N.Y.
Denyse Alexander as Pat (as Denyse MacPherson)

Critical reception
At the time of the film's release, Bosley Crowther of The New York Times wrote "this promising melodrama loses steam and credibility and ends in a sad heap of sentiment that should make an old cloak-and-dagger boy turn gray", while more recently the Radio Times called it "a forgotten gem of the British cinema ... a welcome change from the usual British war movie in which Richard Todd or John Mills carry on regardless."

At the Cannes Film Festival, the American juror, Charles Vidor, complained that the film was offensive to the United States and the film did not progress in the competition, although others felt in was the best in the festival.

References

External links
 
 

Films directed by Anthony Asquith
1958 films
British drama films
British World War II films
Films with screenplays by Paul Dehn
Films produced by Anthony Havelock-Allan
Films scored by Benjamin Frankel
1950s English-language films
1950s British films